Denis Reginald Bullough (29 November 1895 – ?), was a footballer. He was a centre forward at Stockport County from 1919, before moving to Tranmere Rovers in 1921. He was the joint top-scorer for Tranmere in the 1921–22 season – their first in The Football League – netting seven league and cup goals. In 1922 he moved to Southport.

References

1895 births
Year of death missing
Association football forwards
Stockport County F.C. players
Tranmere Rovers F.C. players
Southport F.C. players
English Football League players
English footballers